This is a list of rural localities in Stavropol Krai. Stavropol Krai is a federal subject (a krai) of Russia. It is geographically located in the North Caucasus region in Southern Russia, and is administratively part of the North Caucasian Federal District. Stavropol Krai has a population of 2,786,281 (2010).

Locations 
 Abdul-Gazy
 Abram-Tyube
 Alexandrovskoye
 Arzgir
 Bezopasnoye
 Chur
 Divnoye
 Donskoye
 Etoka
 Grachyovka
 Grigoropolisskaya
 Kochubeyevskoye
 Krasnogvardeyskoye
 Kursavka
 Kurskaya
 Letnyaya Stavka
 Levokumskoye
 Lysogorskaya
 Nezlobnaya
 Novoselitskoye
 Orbelyanovka
 Privolnoye
 Soluno-Dmitriyevskoye
 Stepnoye
 Trunovskoye
 Yessentukskaya
 Yutsa

See also 
 
 Lists of rural localities in Russia

References 

Stavropol Krai